Massimo Silva (born 24 August 1951) is an Italian professional football coach and a former player.

Career

Player 
He has played 4 seasons (90 games, 16 goals) in the Serie A for Ascoli Calcio 1898, A.C. Milan and Delfino Pescara 1936. He scored the goal in the first round of the 1976–77 UEFA Cup that put A.C. Milan past FC Dinamo București.

Coach 
As a coach, he mostly managed lower-level teams, except for two seasons with Ascoli Calcio 1898, including one in the Serie A when he was formally the manager, but the real decisions were made by Marco Giampaolo (Silva possessed the necessary license while Giampaolo did not at the time).

On November 2, 2011 he was appointed head coach of Serie B club Ascoli Calcio 1898. He was sacked on 20 March 2013 and replaced by Rosario Pergolizzi, but on 13 April 2013 he was reinstated as manager.

In 2014 he took over at Lega Pro club Grosseto, serving on two stints during the 2014–15 season (August to November 2014, then March to June 2015). He then served at Serie D level for Campobasso (from February to June 2017) and Isernia (2018–19 season).

On 28 January 2020 he was named new head coach of Serie D club Vastese, replacing Marco Amelia. He left the club at the end of the 2019–20 season and then was hired again on 5 September 2020. He was fired by Vastese on 26 December 2020.

References

1951 births
Living people
Italian footballers
Serie A players
U.S. Cremonese players
Ascoli Calcio 1898 F.C. players
Inter Milan players
A.C. Milan players
A.C. Monza players
Delfino Pescara 1936 players
A.S. Sambenedettese players
A.C.R. Messina players
Italian football managers
Serie A managers
Ternana Calcio managers
A.S. Sambenedettese managers
Frosinone Calcio managers
Ascoli Calcio 1898 F.C. managers
Benevento Calcio managers
Association football forwards